Margaret Williams is a British film and television director based in London, UK. She has directed mainly arts and music-drama films and documentaries.

Career

Williams directed films for the BBC, including the dance film Cross Channel in 1992.  She created a number of films with choreographer Victoria Marks, including Mothers and Daughters in 1994 and later Outside In.

The Wapping Project organized a retrospective of Margaret’s dance films in 2007. Her dance film Veterans was performed and co-created with US Veterans from the West Los Angeles combat rehab/PTSD clinic and won First Prize, the Premi Internacional VideoDansa in Barcelona in 2009. In 2011, One Man Walking, a dance film directed by Williams, was broadcast on Channel 4. The film was choreographed by Kenrick Sandy and devised with Jonzi D. Williams has also adapted stage works for the screen such as Thomas Adès's opera Powder Her Face and Judith Weir's Blond Eckbert, both for Channel 4.

Margaret Williams has collaborated many times with composer Judith Weir, including on film versions of Armida (Weir), filmed in Morocco, and Owen Wingrave, an opera by Benjamin Britten.

References

External links

Year of birth missing (living people)
Living people
British film directors